The Super is an American sitcom television series starring Richard S. Castellano which centers on the superintendent of an apartment building in New York City. The show aired on ABC from June 21, 1972 to August 23, 1972.

Cast
Richard S. Castellano as Joe Girelli
Ardell Sheridan as Francesca Girelli
Margaret Castellano as Joanne Girelli
Bruno Kirby as Anthony Girelli
Phil Mishkin as Frankie Girelli
Ed Peck as Officer Clark
Virginia Vincent as Dottie Clark
Janet Brandt as Mrs. Stein
Louis Basile as Louis

Synopsis
Joe Girelli, the Italian-American superintendent (or "super") of an apartment building in a lower-middle-class section of New York City, is a big man (260 pounds; 118 kg) who prefers to be left alone so that he can drink beer while watching television. However, he rarely gets left alone. His family – wife Francesca, daughter Joanne, son Anthony, and brother Frankie, a big-shot lawyer – continually bothers him, the buildings tenants are constantly banging on the pipes and complaining about him and one another, and city officials always are trying to condemn his building. His children are disrespectful toward him, and an endless series of ethnic and cultural disputes break out among the tenants, which include political revolutionaries, homosexuals, social workers, and police officers, and Italian Americans, Irish Americans, Polish Americans, Jewish Americans, African Americans, and Puerto Ricans.

Production notes
After CBSs All in the Family debuted in 1971, both NBC and ABC tried to emulate its success with situation comedies similarly centered on blue-collar families. NBCs show, Sanford and Son, premiered in January 1972 and became a major hit. For ABC, meanwhile, Rob Reiner, Phil Mishkin, and Gerry Isenberg created The Super, which premiered in June 1972. Reiner and Mishkin wrote the shows first episode.

Mishkin appeared in The Super as Frankie Girelli, while Richard Castellanos real-life daughter Margaret played Joe Girellis daughter Joanne. Coincidentally, Richard Castellano and Bruno Kirby, who played Joe Girellis son Anthony in The Super, both portrayed Pete Clemenza in the Godfather movies, Castellano in The Godfather in 1972 and Kirby as Clemenza as a younger man in The Godfather Part II in 1974.

Broadcast history and cancellation

The Super aired on ABC at 8:00 p.m. Eastern Time on Wednesday throughout its brief run. It never gained the audience that All in the Family and Sanford and Son did, and was cancelled after only 10 episodes had aired; its eleventh and twelfth episodes, preempted by television coverage of the 1972 Summer Olympic Games on August 30 and September 6, 1972, respectively, were never broadcast.

Episodes

References

External links 

 The Super opening credits on YouTube

American Broadcasting Company original programming
1972 American television series debuts
1972 American television series endings
1970s American sitcoms
English-language television shows
Television series by Metromedia
Television shows set in New York City